The Lecale Coast AONB was an Area of Outstanding Natural Beauty (AONB) on the Lecale peninsula in County Down, Northern Ireland.

Geographic location
It is located between Strangford Lough and the Mourne Mountains and has a low, sometimes sandy, rocky or grassy shoreline. Its southern tip lies along an extensive sand dune system at Dundrum Bay. Stretching from Dundrum Bay to Strangford village, the coastline is a place of delightful coves, dramatic headlands and secluded sandy beaches.

AONB designation
It was originally designated an AONB in 1967, covering an area of 31.08 km2. It was merged with the Strangford Lough AONB in 2010 to form the new Strangford and Lecale AONB.

References

Areas of Outstanding Natural Beauty in County Down
Protected areas established in 1967
Northern Ireland coast